Marthen Christian Warobay or just Christian Warobay (born 12 July 1984 in Papua) is an Indonesian footballer who plays as a defender for Indonesian football club Persidafon Jayapura. He move from Sriwijaya FC after he give 3rd Piala Indonesia champions.

International career
In 2007, he played to represent the Indonesia U-23, in 2007 SEA Games.

Honours

Club honors
Persipura Jayapura
Liga Indonesia (1): 2005

Sriwijaya
Liga Indonesia (1): 2007–08
Piala Indonesia (3): 2007–08, 2008–09, 2010

Individual honors
Liga Indonesia Best player (1): 2005

References

External links
 Profile - Christian Warobay

1984 births
Living people
Papuan people
Indonesian Christians
Persidafon
Indonesian footballers
Indonesia international footballers
Association football fullbacks
Persipura Jayapura players
Sriwijaya F.C. players
Persidafon Dafonsoro players
Sportspeople from Papua